Rheic may refer to:
 Rheic Ocean, a Paleozoic ocean between the large continent Gondwana to the south and the microcontinents Avalonia and others
 Rheic acid, a synonym for the molecule rhein